WFSP-FM is a classic hits and oldies formatted broadcast radio station.  The station is licensed to Kingwood, West Virginia and serves Kingwood and Morgantown in West Virginia and Oakland in Maryland.  WFSP-FM is owned by David Wills and operated under their WFSP Radio, LLC. licensee.

Sale

On June 6, 2013, WFSP-FM and sister station WFSP were sold to Kingwood-based WFSP Radio, LLC for $500,000.  The sale was closed on September 30, 2013.

References

External links
Good Time Oldies 107.7 Online

1991 establishments in West Virginia
Classic hits radio stations in the United States
Oldies radio stations in the United States
Radio stations established in 1991
FSP-FM